The 2000 Vojvodina provincial elections were held on 24 September and 8 October 2000.

Electoral system
The 120 members of the Assembly of the Autonomous Province of Vojvodina were elected from 120 electoral districts using the "first-past-the-post" system.

Results

See also
Autonomous Province of Vojvodina
Politics of Vojvodina
Overthrow of Slobodan Milošević

Vojvodina
Vojvodina
Elections in Vojvodina
Vojvodina
Overthrow of Slobodan Milošević